Dellwood is a city in the north St. Louis County, Missouri, United States. The population was 5,025 at the 2010 census.
The center of Dellwood or the city of Dellwood was located at the intersections of West Florissant Ave. and Chambers Road.

Geography
Dellwood is located at  (38.758250, −90.274461).

Demographics

2010 census
As of the census of 2010, there were 5,025 people, 1,834 households, and 1,336 families living in the city. The racial makeup of the city was 18.0% White, 79.2% African American, 0.5% Native American, 0.4% Asian, 0.3% from other races, and 1.7% from two or more races. Hispanic or Latino of any race were 0.8% of the population.

There were 1,834 households, of which 42.8% had children under the age of 18 living with them, 32.5% were married couples living together, 34.1% had a female householder with no husband present, 6.3% had a male householder with no wife present, and 27.2% were non-families. 23.4% of all households were made up of individuals, and 7.4% had someone living alone who was 65 years of age or older. The average household size was 2.74 and the average family size was 3.22.

The median age in the city was 34.6 years. 29.1% of residents were under the age of 18; 9.7% were between the ages of 18 and 24; 26.4% were from 25 to 44; 25.7% were from 45 to 64; and 8.9% were 65 years of age or older. The gender makeup of the city was 44.5% male and 55.5% female.

2000 census
As of the census of 2000, there were 5,255 people, 1,906 households, and 1,408 families living in the city. The racial makeup of the city was 39.51% White, 58.19% African American, 0.29% Native American, 0.65% Asian, 0.21% from other races, and 1.16% from two or more races. Hispanic or Latino of any race were 0.34% of the population.

There were 1,906 households, out of which 40.3% had children under the age of 18 living with them, 44.0% were married couples living together, 24.4% had a female householder with no husband present, and 26.1% were non-families. 23.4% of all households were made up of individuals, and 10.9% had someone living alone who was 65 years of age or older. The average household size was 2.76 and the average family size was 3.24.

In the city, the population was spread out, with 31.6% under the age of 18, 7.4% from 18 to 24, 31.6% from 25 to 44, 17.4% from 45 to 64, and 12.0% who were 65 years of age or older. The median age was 34 years. For every 100 females, there were 86.3 males. For every 100 females age 18 and over, there were 80.7 males.

The median income for a household in the city was $43,210, and the median income for a family was $43,887. Males had a median income of $33,581 versus $24,836 for females. The per capita income for the city was $16,856. About 2.3% of families and 3.0% of the population were below the poverty line, including 2.8% of those under age 18 and 5.3% of those age 65 or over.

Police Department
As of early 2012, the city of Dellwood decided to have police services provided by the St. Louis County Police Department, rather than continuing to have their own police force. Officers from the old force may have joined the St. Louis County Police or found positions elsewhere. Dellwood cars operated by the SLCPD are specifically marked for the city.

References

External links
 Dellwood elected officials

Cities in St. Louis County, Missouri
Cities in Missouri